Daniel Milton Peek was an American musician best known as a member of the folk rock band America from 1970 to 1977, together with Gerry Beckley and Dewey Bunnell. He has been called a "pioneer in contemporary Christian music".

Early life 
Peek was born in Panama City, Florida, on November 1, 1950, while his father was in the U.S. Air Force.

Beginning in 1963, Peek was educated at London Central Elementary High School at Bushey Hall in North London. For the 1965–66 school year, Peek attended San Angelo Central High School after his family relocated from Pakistan earlier that year. He moved again to England in 1968 with his family when his father was assigned to a base in London. It is there that he met Bunnell and Beckley at London Central High School.

In 1973 he married Catherine Maberry (d. March 11, 2021), with whom he would write a number of songs, including "Lonely People".

Peek remembered this experience when, about a year before he died, he decided to dispose of five of his vintage guitars. Because the Ronald McDonald Houses exist to provide housing for families of hospitalized children close to hospitals around the United States and the world, Peek donated these five guitars to the San Diego house, which were subsequently sold to a collector, resulting in a $50,000 donation.

Career

America

After a brief stint at Old Dominion University in Virginia during 1969, Peek returned from the U.S. back to London. Soon afterwards, the three former London Central High School classmates Peek, Beckley, and Bunnell began making music together. Known for singing the high harmonies, Dan Peek contributed lead and backing vocals, guitars, bass, keyboards, and harmonica to their recordings during his tenure in the band. As a member of America, Peek wrote or co-wrote four Top 100 singles: "Don't Cross the River" (No. 35), "Lonely People" (No. 5), "Woman Tonight" (No. 44), and "Today's the Day" (No. 23), all of which he also sang lead on. "Lonely People" and "Today's the Day" also hit No. 1 on the Billboard AC charts.

Peek abused alcohol and other drugs during his time touring with the band and elected to leave shortly after America's February 1977 release of the Harbor album, disenchanted with the travel, recreational drug use, and female groupies. In 2004, he released an autobiography about that era entitled An American Band: The America Story which was very difficult for him to write because of the bad memories it brought up.

Contemporary Christian music 
Years of life on the road with America had taken a toll on him. He renounced drugs and alcohol, renewed his Christian faith, and began to seek a different artistic direction than Beckley or Bunnell. He went on to sign with Pat Boone's Lamb & Lion Records and found renewed success as a pioneering artist in the emerging Christian pop music genre.

Peek's debut solo album, All Things Are Possible, was released in 1979. Chris Christian co-wrote, produced, and contributed acoustic guitar and backing vocals on the album. The title track reached the Billboard charts, making the Top 10 in the A/C Billboard chart and number 1 in the Christian charts, becoming one of the earliest contemporary Christian music crossover hits. Another song on the album, "Love Was Just Another Word", was recorded in Los Angeles and written by Chris Christian and Steve Kipner. Gerry Beckley and Dewey Bunnell contributed the background vocals. This was the last time the three original members of America recorded together. At the 22nd Grammy Awards, the album was nominated, losing in the Contemporary Gospel category to The Imperials album Heed the Call.

Peek waited five years before releasing a second solo album, 1984's Doer of the Word, which hit number 2 in the Christian charts. Gerry Beckley contributed background vocals, which were recorded at Chris Christian's studio in Los Angeles while Peek was there. 1986 saw the release of his Electrovoice album, again to the CCM market, which included a remake of "Lonely People", featuring a very similar lead vocal treatment and overall arrangement to the original America version. He changed some of the song's lyrics to reflect his Christian faith; for example, the lines "And ride that highway in the sky" and "You never know until you try" became "And give your heart to Jesus Christ".

Peek spent much of the 1990s in semi-retirement, occasionally recording music at his home in Bodden Town, Grand Cayman Island. He released several solo projects and collaborated with Ken Marvin and Brian Gentry as "Peace" on three albums. In the years before his death, Peek released music via his website. His last musical collaboration was performing lead vocal on a track on the 2011 album Steps on the Water by Etcetera.

He published An American Band, an autobiography based on America's most successful period, and his own spiritual journey.

Death 
Peek died in his sleep of uremic pericarditis on July 24, 2011, at the age of 60 at his home in Farmington, Missouri. He was interred in Farmington's Zolman Cemetery.

Discography 
See also America discography

References

External links 
 
 
 Official America website
 Obituary of Dan Peek, The Daily Telegraph, 27 July, 2011
 Dan Peek Autopsy Report, ParklandNews.com

1950 births
2011 deaths
People from Panama City, Florida
American rock musicians
American performers of Christian music
American soft rock musicians
American expatriates in the United Kingdom
America (band) members
People from Farmington, Missouri
American rock singers
American rock guitarists
American folk guitarists
American male guitarists
American country guitarists
American multi-instrumentalists
Singer-songwriters from Florida
Singer-songwriters from Missouri
Guitarists from Missouri
20th-century American guitarists
Country musicians from Florida
Country musicians from Missouri
20th-century American male musicians
American male singer-songwriters